NGC 128 is a lenticular galaxy in the constellation Pisces. It is approximately 190 million light-years from the Sun and has a diameter of about 165,000 light-years.

Discovery
NGC 128 was discovered by astronomer William Herschel on 25 December 1790 using a reflecting telescope with an aperture of 18.7 inches. At the time of discovery, its coordinates were recorded as 00h 22m 05s, +87° 54.6′ -20.0″. It was later observed by John Herschel
on 12 October 1827.

Visual appearance
The galaxy is described as "pretty bright", "very small" with a "brighter middle". It is approximately 165,000 light years in diameter and is elongated. The galaxy is famous for its (peanut shell)-shaped bulge, and in 2016 it was discovered that there are two such nested structures, possibly associated with two stellar bars.

Galaxy group information
NGC 128 is the largest member, and the namesake of, the NGC 128 group which also includes the galaxies NGC 127 and NGC 130. NGC 128 has a strong tidal bridge with NGC 127 and there is evidence of interaction between all three galaxies in the group. NGC 128 has a noticeable peanut shape that is likely to be caused by gravitational effects of the other two galaxies.

Gallery

See also
List of NGC objects (1–1000)
NGC 125
NGC 126
NGC 127
NGC 130

References

External links
 

Lenticular galaxies
0128
Astronomical objects discovered in 1790
Pisces (constellation)